James Gan Teik Chai (颜德财) (born 5 February 1983) is a Malaysian badminton player. He won the men's doubles title at the 2004 French International tournament partnered with Koo Kien Keat. He also won the 2009 Australian Open Grand Prix tournament with Tan Bin Shen. Teamed-up with Ong Soon Hock, he won the 2012 BWF International tournament in Mauritius, Argentina, and Brazil.

Achievements

Southeast Asian Games 
Men's doubles

BWF Superseries 
The BWF Superseries, which was launched on 14 December 2006 and implemented in 2007, was a series of elite badminton tournaments, sanctioned by the Badminton World Federation (BWF). BWF Superseries levels were Superseries and Superseries Premier. A season of Superseries consisted of twelve tournaments around the world that had been introduced since 2011. Successful players were invited to the Superseries Finals, which were held at the end of each year.

Men's doubles

  BWF Superseries Finals tournament
  BWF Superseries Premier tournament
  BWF Superseries tournament

BWF Grand Prix 
The BWF Grand Prix had two levels, the Grand Prix and Grand Prix Gold. It was a series of badminton tournaments sanctioned by the Badminton World Federation (BWF) and played between 2007 and 2017.

Men's doubles

Mixed doubles

  BWF Grand Prix Gold tournament
  BWF Grand Prix tournament

BWF International Challenge/Series 
Men's doubles

  BWF International Challenge tournament
  BWF International Series tournament
  BWF Future Series tournament

References

External links 
 

1983 births
Living people
People from Kedah
Malaysian male badminton players
Malaysian sportspeople of Chinese descent
Competitors at the 2007 Southeast Asian Games
Southeast Asian Games bronze medalists for Malaysia
Southeast Asian Games medalists in badminton